Sex party may refer to:

Sex party (group sex), a group gathering at which sexual activity takes place
Australian Sex Party, an Australian political party founded in 2009
The Sex Party, a political party based in British Columbia, Canada